Dibekli is a village in the Yüksekova District of Hakkâri Province in Turkey. The village had a population of 257 in 2022. The two hamlets of Odabaşı and Dallıca are attached to it.

History 
The village was populated by 16 Assyrian families in 1850 and 10 families in 1877.

Population 
Population history from 2000 to 2022:

References 

Villages in Yüksekova District
Kurdish settlements in Hakkâri Province
Historic Assyrian communities in Turkey